Blues, Ballads and Beyond is the tenth classical/new music studio album from trombonist Mark Hetzler on the Summit Records label.  It was critically acclaimed by Classical Musical Sentinel, "He can shape, flex, caress, torture, stress, accent and animate notes on the fly and bring anything he plays to life. All the pieces on this new CD were well chosen to showcase his command of the instrument, and the range of styles he easily slips into is impressive"  Numerous prominent performing artists and composers are featured on the recording to include Michael Colgrass, Enrique Crespo, Daniel Schnyder, Robert Suderburg, John Stevens, and Jack Cooper.

Background 
Blues, Ballads and Beyond features jazz and commercially influenced music by contemporary classical composers.  The list of composers for the recording is diverse and to include Michael Colgrass, Enrique Crespo, Daniel Schnyder, Robert Suderburg, John Stevens, and Jack Cooper.  American Record Guide is quoted to say Mark Hetzler is “..one of the world’s great trombone players” and the recording helps to demonstrate his prowess on the instrument.  Much like his past recordings with Summit Records, this recording has a wide range of musical influences and was completed in numerous recording sessions throughout 2011-2013.

Track listing

Recording Sessions 
 Throughout 2013/2014
 all tracks recorded at Mills Concert Hall, the University of Wisconsin–Madison

Personnel

Musicians 

 Trombone: Mark Hetzler
 Percussion: Anthony Di Sanza
 Marimba: Sean Kleve
 Vibraphone: Brett Walter
 Vibraphone: Joseph Murfin
 Piano/keyboards: Vincent Fuh
 Piano: Marthe Fischer
 Narration: Buss Kemper
 Bass: Nick Moran
 Drums (set): Todd Hammes
 Congas: Yorel Lashley

Production 

 Producer, conductor, engineer: Mark Hetzler
 Digital Mastering: Bob Katz at Digital Domain
 Liner Notes: Michael Colgrass, Dennis Llinás, Mark Hetzler, Daniel Schnyder, Robert Suderburg, Brian Lynn, John Stevens, Jack Cooper
 Cover art and design: Daniel Traynor
 Photography: Katrin Talbot

Reception 

"Mind boggling is how well he plays the trombone...Unbelievable! Remarkable playing. What being a true musician is all about."

Jean-Yves Duperron - Classical Music Sentinel

"Trombonist Mark Hetzler has assembled a collection of contemporary trombone compositions that brighten the light on this often ill-considered instrument on his Blues, Ballads, and Beyond: Influences Outside the Concert Hall."

C. Michael Bailey - All About Jazz

"Listeners seeking excellent interpretations of the familiar works on this album with find it.  Those seeking newer works with influences beyond the concert hall will be even better served by this album."

Jeremy Kolwinska -  ITA Journal

Release history

See also
Mark Hetzler
Empire Brass
Michael Colgrass
Enrique Crespo
Daniel Schnyder
Robert Suderburg
John Stevens
Jack Cooper

References

External links
 Blues, Ballads and Beyond at Summit Records
 Blues, Ballads and Beyond at All Music Guide

2015 classical albums
Classical albums by American artists